Lester Lamont Larson was an American college football player and coach. He was the first head football coach in the history of the University of Louisville, serving in that position form 1912 to 1913. At the time of his hiring, he was working as a typewriter salesman His first team at Louisville in 1912 finished with a record of 3 wins and 1 loss. His second team in 1913 finished with a record of 5 wins and 1 loss, including a 100–0 win over Washington College of Tennessee.

Prior to that, Larson served as the head coach for one season at Texas A&M University, leading the Aggies to a 6–1–1 record.

Larson attended the University of Chicago and a member of the 1905 Chicago Maroons football team that won a national championship under Amos Alonzo Stagg. He won a varsity letter that season. He attended at West Aurora High School in Aurora, Illinois.

Head coaching record

References

Year of birth missing
Year of death missing
American football ends
Chicago Maroons football players
Texas A&M Aggies football coaches
Louisville Cardinals football coaches
Sportspeople from Aurora, Illinois
Coaches of American football from Illinois
Players of American football from Illinois